Adam Wheeler (born 3 April 1980) is an Australian former professional rugby league footballer who played as a  for the Parramatta Eels in the NRL in 2000.

Playing career
A local junior, Wheeler captained the Parramatta Eels in his side's 28–12 loss to the North Sydney Bears in the 1998 Jersey Flegg Cup. He made his lone first grade appearance from the bench in his sides' 32−24 victory over the St George Illawarra Dragons at the Sydney Football Stadium in round 26 of the 2000 season. He would play the rest of his career in the lower grades. He was released by the Eels at the end of the 2003 season.

References

1980 births
Living people
Australian rugby league players
Parramatta Eels players
Rugby league props
Rugby league players from Sydney